Kisses is a 1922 American silent comedy film directed by Maxwell Karger and starring Alice Lake, Harry Myers and Edward Connelly.

Cast
 Alice Lake as Betty Ellen Estabrook 
 Harry Myers as Bill Bailey 
 Edward Connelly as Thomas Estabrook 
 Edward Jobson as John Maynard 
 Dana Todd as Norman Maynard 
 Mignon Anderson as Bessie Neldon 
 John McKinnon as Edward Nelson 
 Eugene Pouyet as Gustave

References

Bibliography
 Munden, Kenneth White. The American Film Institute Catalog of Motion Pictures Produced in the United States, Part 1. University of California Press, 1997.

External links

1922 films
1922 comedy films
Silent American comedy films
Films directed by Maxwell Karger
American silent feature films
1920s English-language films
American black-and-white films
Metro Pictures films
1920s American films